CD205 also called Lymphocyte antigen 75 is a protein that in humans is encoded by the LY75 gene.

CD205 is also known as DEC-205.

References

Further reading

 
 
 
 
 
 
 
 
 

Clusters of differentiation
C-type lectins